In geometry, ellipsoid packing is the problem of arranging identical ellipsoid throughout three-dimensional space to fill the maximum possible fraction of space.

The currently densest known packing structure for ellipsoid has two candidates,
a simple monoclinic crystal with two ellipsoids of different orientations and
a square-triangle crystal containing 24 ellipsoids in the fundamental cell. Any ellipsoids with aspect ratios larger than one can pack denser than spheres.

See also
 Packing problems
 Sphere packing
 Tetrahedron packing

References 

Packing problems